Gerald Francis Bowden (26 August 1935 – 7 January 2020) was a British Conservative MP, who represented Dulwich from 1983 until 1992. He was defeated by future Labour cabinet minister Tessa Jowell in the 1992 general election.

Career
He was an honours graduate in Jurisprudence from Magdalen College, Oxford; was called to the bar at Gray's Inn and qualified as a chartered surveyor at the College of Estate Management, practising part-time in these professions. Commissioned during National Service he continued to serve in the Territorial Army, retiring in the rank of Lieutenant Colonel. He held an academic appointment as a principal lecturer in the law of property at London South Bank University (formerly South Bank Polytechnic) from 1971 to 1984. On leaving Parliament he took up an academic appointment at Kingston University and resumed practice at the planning bar. Gerald Bowden also represented Dulwich on the Greater London Council 1977–81.

He was a trustee of the Royal Albert Hall, and was previously Chairman of the Dulwich Estate (Alleyn's College of God's Gift) and the Walcot Foundation, a trustee of the Magdalen College Development Trust, and the Oxford and Cambridge Club.

Personal life 
Bowden's daughter Emma died when the seaplane she was travelling in crashed into Cowan Creek, north of the Australian city of Sydney, on New Year's Eve, 2017. Emma and her daughter Heather Bowden-Page were both killed immediately alongside her fiancé Richard Cousins, 58, and his two sons William, 25, and Edward, 23.

References

Sources
Times Guide to the House of Commons 1992
Hansard
Who's Who

External links

2020 deaths
1935 births
Conservative Party (UK) MPs for English constituencies
Members of the Greater London Council
UK MPs 1983–1987
UK MPs 1987–1992
Politics of the London Borough of Southwark
Alumni of Magdalen College, Oxford
Alumni of University College of Estate Management
Academics of London South Bank University
Members of Gray's Inn